Bruno Manuel Araújo Braga (born 17 June 1983) is a Portuguese professional footballer who plays for S.C. Salgueiros as a midfielder.

Club career
Born in Massarelos, Porto District, Braga began his career with hometown's S.C. Salgueiros, being sparingly used over the course of two second division seasons. In 2004, as the club was in the midst of a severe financial crisis – which eventually led to its liquidation – he left and signed for F.C. Tirsense, going on to spend several years in the lower leagues; in 2006–07, he helped Leça F.C. promote to the third tier.

In the summer of 2008, Braga moved straight into the Primeira Liga, joining Leixões SC. He made his debut in the competition on 24 August by playing 20 minutes in a 1–3 home loss against C.D. Nacional, and finished his debut campaign with 27 matches (22 starts) and five goals as the Matosinhos side finished in sixth position, narrowly missing out on qualification to the UEFA Europa League; two of those came at the Estádio do Dragão in a 3–2 win over FC Porto, as he won the SJPF Player of the Month award for October 2008.

Mainly due to injuries, Braga appeared less in 2009–10, and Leixões suffered relegation. He continued in the top flight, however, signing a one-year contract with Rio Ave FC.

Honours
Leça
Terceira Divisão: 2006–07

Rio Ave
Taça de Portugal runner-up: 2013–14
Taça da Liga runner-up: 2013–14

Aves
Taça de Portugal: 2017–18

References

External links

1983 births
Living people
Sportspeople from Porto District
Portuguese footballers
Association football midfielders
Primeira Liga players
Liga Portugal 2 players
Segunda Divisão players
S.C. Salgueiros players
F.C. Tirsense players
Leça F.C. players
Leixões S.C. players
Rio Ave F.C. players
F.C. Penafiel players
G.D. Chaves players
C.D. Aves players
Girabola players
S.L. Benfica (Luanda) players
Portuguese expatriate footballers
Expatriate footballers in Angola
Portuguese expatriate sportspeople in Angola